The Egypt–Gaza barrier is a steel border barrier constructed by Egypt along its 14 kilometres (7.5 miles) border with the Gaza Strip. The Rafah border crossing is the only border crossing between the Gaza Strip and Egypt.

In December 2009, with help from the United States, Egypt started building a steel wall along the Gaza border. If it is finished, the wall will be 10–11 km (6–7 miles) long and extend 18 metres (60 feet) below the surface. The wall was to be completed in 18 months.

On 29 October 2014, Egypt began demolishing homes on its side of the border with the Gaza Strip as part of a planned 500 metres (550 yards) buffer zone intended to prevent weapons smuggling into the Gaza Strip.

In February 2020, Egypt began building a new 3 kilometre (2 mile) concrete wall along its border with the Gaza Strip, from Gaza's southeastern tip at Kerem Shalom (Karam Abu Salem) to the Rafah border crossing. The new wall is in addition to the old wall, and will not be more than 8 metres from the old one. Both walls are within Egyptian territory. The wall will be 7 metres high and will be equipped with electronic sensors.

Technical aspects
The project has received technical cooperation from the United States and France.

Egypt reinforced the border with several hundred troops to protect construction crews from Palestinian sniper attacks.

Palestinian sources said that construction of the barrier was damaging dozens of smuggling tunnels as deep as 30 meters (100 feet), causing them to collapse on a nearly daily basis and killing operators, especially tunnels near the Rafah border terminal. They added that most of the 1,500 tunnels between Gaza and Egypt remained unaffected. The sources also stated that the project has alarmed the Hamas regime in the Gaza Strip, which charges an annual $2,500 for the right to operate a tunnel.

Smuggling tunnels

In January 2008, Palestinian militants breached several parts of the wall bordering the town of Rafah. Thousands of Gazans flowed into Egypt in search of food and supplies.  

According to analysts at a January 2010 Egyptian security conference, the barrier reflects Egypt's concern that al-Qaeda-inspired militants from the Gaza Strip will infiltrate Egypt after being forced out by Hamas, the de facto governing authority in the Strip, which Israel considers a terrorist group, along with the EU, USA, Egypt and others. The analysts said Egypt could become a haven and a battleground for small Salafist militant groups such as Jund Ansar Allah, Army of Islam and Jaljalat, which have been squashed by Hamas since it took control in 2007. The barrier has proved to be of little effect, with it being "breached hundreds of times" according to an Egyptian security official.

After the fall of the Mubarak regime in 2011, Egypt relaxed restrictions at its border with the Gaza Strip, allowing more Palestinians to cross freely for the first time in four years. The Egyptian army continued to destroy Gaza Strip smuggling tunnels, according to the Egyptian army "in order to fight any element of terrorism". As of April 2013, Egypt reinforced its troops on the border with the Gaza Strip. Egyptian Army has been destroying  tunnels by flooding them.

By September 2021, Egypt had destroyed more than 3,000 smuggling tunnels over six years by flooding them or by pumping in toxic gas, at times resulting in deaths.

Support
In 2010, Palestinian Authority President Mahmoud Abbas declared support for the barrier, adding: "It is the Egyptians’ sovereign right in their own country. Legitimate supplies should be brought through the legal crossings." The United States announced its support for the barrier saying it would help to prevent weapons smuggling. Cairo's main Al-Azhar University officially backed the government's decision saying that it was the "state's right to build along its walls facilities and obstacles that will enhance its security."

Opposition
Militant Islamist group Hamas, the de facto governing authority of the Gaza Strip, opposes the barrier and has called it a "wall of death".

Hassan Nasrallah, chief of Lebanese militant group Hezbollah, called on Egypt to halt construction.

The Islamic Action Front, a Jordanian Islamist group, criticized Egypt for the barrier and accused it of "collaborating" with Israel and the United States. "The Egyptian authorities are ...increasing the suffering of the Palestinians in Gaza by building the steel wall and closing the border crossings with Gaza," said Hamzah Mansour, a member of the Shura Council of the Islamic Action Front.

A number of prominent Muslim clerics issued edicts against the wall, while Sheikh Yusuf Qaradawi, affiliated with the Muslim Brotherhood in Egypt, voiced his objection to the wall. In January 2010, small protests against the wall were held outside the Egyptian embassies in Jordan and Lebanon.

In a 2010 Palestinian demonstration along the border, an Egyptian border guard was shot dead and 20 Palestinians were injured from Egyptian fire.

See also
Philadelphi Route
Israel–Egypt barrier
Israel–Gaza barrier
Israeli West Bank barrier

References

Egypt–Gaza border
Border barriers
Fortifications in Egypt
Separation barriers
2009 establishments in Egypt